Robert Kaštrun (born 25 March 1964) is a Slovenian skier. He competed in the Nordic combined event at the 1984 Winter Olympics.

References

External links
 

1964 births
Living people
Slovenian male Nordic combined skiers
Olympic Nordic combined skiers of Yugoslavia
Nordic combined skiers at the 1984 Winter Olympics
People from Tržič